New York's 121st State Assembly district is one of the 150 districts in the New York State Assembly. It has been represented by Republican Joe Angelino since 2023, succeeding John Salka. Prior to redistricting, Angelino represented District 122.

Geography

2020s 
District 121 contains portions of Broome, Chenango, Delaware, Madison, Otsego and Sullivan counties.

2010s 
This district encompasses the entirety of Madison County and portions of Oneida County and Otsego County.

Recent election results

2022

2020

2018

2016

2014

2012

References 

121
Otsego County, New York
Madison County, New York
Oneida County, New York